Damovo is a provider of information and communication technology services. The company, owned by Global Growth, has a regional presence across Europe, the Americas and APAC, with a global support capability spanning over 150 countries.

History 
Damovo was formerly a division of the Swedish telecoms group Ericsson. In 2001, the London-based Apax Partners acquired and spun off the direct sales and service operations division into a separate company in a management buy out led by Pearse Flynn. At the time Damovo was based in Glasgow, Scotland. Flynn served as chief executive of the company until 2003. In December 2006 Apax handed over its entire equity stake in the company to its creditors. 

In January 2015 Damovo Europe was acquired by Oakley Capital Equity II. Matthew Riley, founder of the Daisy Group, was appointed Executive Chairman. Damovo UK was also acquired by Daisy in a separate deal.

In August 2015 Damovo acquired the voice and unified communications business of Centre de Télécommunications et Téléinformatiques Luxembourgeois (CTTL) in Luxembourg. This was the first acquisition by Damovo, since it was acquired by Oakley Capital earlier in the year.

In November 2016 Damovo completed the acquisition of Netfarmers GmbH – a Germany-based company focused in unified communications, security and networking. In June 2017 Damovo acquired of Swiss-based Voice & Data Network AG (Vodanet).

Damovo was acquired by the American investment fund Global Growth in July 2018.

Products 
The Damovo portfolio includes solutions in the areas of Unified Communications & Collaboration, Enterprise Networks, Contact Centers, Cloud Services and Global Services.

Main technology partners are Avaya, Cisco, Microsoft and Mitel.

References 

2001 establishments in Scotland
VoIP companies